Hemeromyia is a genus of flies (Diptera).

Species
H. afghanica Papp, 1979
H. alberichae Stucke, 2016
H. anthracina Collin, 1949
H. australis Barraclough, 1994
H. longicornis Papp, 2003
H. longirostris Carles-Tolrá, 1992
H. obscura Coquillett, 1902
H. remotinervis (Strobl, 1902)
H. vibrissina Papp, 2003
H. washingtona (Melander, 1913)

References

Carnidae
Taxa named by Daniel William Coquillett
Carnoidea genera